Henryk Grabowski (19 October 1929 – 3 March 2012) was a Polish long jumper. He competed at the 1952 and 1956 Summer Olympics.

He won the bronze medal in the long jump at the 1958 European Athletics Championships. During his career, he broke the Polish record eight times, culminating in a career best of 7.81 metres.

References

1929 births
2012 deaths
Polish male long jumpers
Athletes (track and field) at the 1952 Summer Olympics
Athletes (track and field) at the 1956 Summer Olympics
Olympic athletes of Poland
People from Czeladź
European Athletics Championships medalists
Sportspeople from Silesian Voivodeship
20th-century Polish people